Fanny Biascamano (born 16 September 1979 in Sète, Hérault), known as Fanny, is a French singer.

Biography
She became known in 1991 by participating at the age of 12 years to sequence "Numéro 1 de demain" in TV show Sacrée Soirée host by Jean-Pierre Foucault on TF1. Her performance of Édith Piaf's rock hit "L'Homme à la moto" allows her to release her first single. It became a top seven hit in France and earned a gold record.

The same year, she released her first album, entitled Fanny, and her second single, "Un poète disparu". In 1993, she released her second album, wrote by Didier Barbelivien, but its success was confidential.

In 1997, she was chosen to represent France at Eurovision Song Contest in Dublin with a title called "Sentiments songes". She was ranked at the seventh place with 95 points.

Discography

Albums
 1992 : Fanny
 1993 : Chanteuse populaire

Singles
 1991 : "L'Homme à la moto"
 1992 : "Un poète disparu" 
 1992 : "On s'écrit"
 1993  Halo
 1994  Solo my self

References

External links
 Official site

1979 births
Living people
People from Sète
Eurovision Song Contest entrants for France
Eurovision Song Contest entrants of 1997
Fanny
21st-century French singers
21st-century French women singers